Har Shaakh Pe Ullu Baithaa Hai is an Indian sitcom television series, that premiered on 26 February 2018 on StarPlus. The Show stars Rajeev Nigam and Samta Sagar in Lead Roles. The Show is produced by Garima Productions.

Plot
“Promise what benefits them and do what benefits us!” has been the mantra of our opportunistic politicians for ages now. Still, whenever some shrewd politician shows up with sweet words and a welcoming smile the junta votes again hoping that the solution has arrived! Shri Chaitu Lal is Chief Minister of a fictional state named Ulta Pradesh. This Chief Minister is known for fooling the innocent citizens by making false promises. Chaitu is a fairly manipulative, wise with words and is of an opportunistic kind. His 'thenga party' vouches only for black money by manipulating the system. He promises what benefits the common man but does what benefits him. Supporting him in this comedy show is his wife Imli Devi. She stands by her husband through the thick and thin. Even though Chaitu is the leader of the ruling party when it comes to home, his wife is his biggest support system. Imli hopes to see her brother and CM's enthusiastic brother-in-law, Putan as the Prime Minister of the nation. Putan a youth icon of his state is as shrewd as his Jijaji. He has 13 cases lodged against him and has purchased degrees from all the top colleges of the state. Puttan is no less to Chaitu in any way when it comes to politics and corruption.

Cast

Main
 Rajeev Nigam as Chaitu Lal - The Chief Minister of Ulta Pradesh (Fictional State)
 Samta Sagar as Imli Devi - Chaitu Lal's Wife
 Ishtiyak Khan as Puttan - Chaitu Lal's Brother-in-law

Recurring
 Melissa Pais as Malai Devi - Chaitu Lal's Sister-in-law
 Shradha Rani Sharma as Genda Devi - Leader of Opposition Party
 Dishank Arora as Genda Devi's Paternal Aunt's Husband
 Poornima Verma as Rajneeti
 Alika Nair as Party
 Sonam Shekhawat as Ghotali
 Riya Raval as Sarkar
 Naitik Chudasama as Bahumat
 Kinjal Mehta as Haseena Devi
 Lalita Sen as Monica - Chaitu's First Personal Assistant
 Babita Anand as Chaaya - Chaitu's Second Personal Assistant
 Gazala Selmin as Parvati
 Abhishek Agarwal as Bundi

References

External links 
 Har Shaakh Pe Ullu Baithaa Hai Streaming on Hotstar

2018 Indian television series debuts
Hindi-language television shows
StarPlus original programming
Indian television sitcoms
Television shows set in Mumbai
2018 Indian television series endings
2010s satirical television series
Indian political television series